Ilandari Dewage Nuwan Thushara (born 6 August 1994) is a professional Sri Lankan cricketer currently plays T20Is for national team. A fast bowler with a slinging action, Thushara made his international debut for the Sri Lanka cricket team in February 2022 against Australia. He is a past pupil of Thalawa Kanitu Vidyalaya, Alpitiya.

Career
He made his first-class debut for Sinhalese Sports Club in the 2015–16 Premier League Tournament on 26 December 2015. He made his List A debut for Colombo Cricket Club in the 2017–18 Premier Limited Overs Tournament on 10 March 2018. In October 2020, he was drafted by the Galle Gladiators for the inaugural edition of the Lanka Premier League. In August 2021, he was named in the SLC Greens team for the 2021 SLC Invitational T20 League tournament. In November 2021, he was selected to play for the Galle Gladiators following the players' draft for the 2021 Lanka Premier League.

In January 2022, he was named in Sri Lanka's One Day International (ODI) squad for their series against Zimbabwe. Later the month, he was named in Sri Lanka's Twenty20 International (T20I) squad for their away series against Australia. He made his T20I debut on 13 February 2022, for Sri Lanka against Australia. In June 2022, he was named in Sri Lanka's One Day International (ODI) squad for their home series against Australia.

In July 2022, he was signed by the Galle Gladiators for the third edition of the Lanka Premier League.

References

External links
 

1994 births
Living people
Sri Lankan cricketers
Sri Lanka Twenty20 International cricketers
Colombo Cricket Club cricketers
Sinhalese Sports Club cricketers
Galle Gladiators cricketers